Katos is a village in the Lachin Rayon of Azerbaijan.

References

Villages in Azerbaijan 
Populated places in Lachin District